Paratettix aztecus, the Aztec pygmy grasshopper, is a species of pygmy grasshopper in the family Tetrigidae. It is found in Central America, North America, and South America.

References

External links

 

Tetrigidae
Articles created by Qbugbot
Insects described in 1861